The Reading Standpipe was a historic water tower atop a hill near the corner of Auburn and Beacon Streets in Reading, Massachusetts.  The  tower was built in 1890-91 as part of Reading's first water supply system, and was for many years a significant community landmark.  The tower was built of steel and wrought iron in a style reminiscent of medieval fortifications.

The tower was added to the National Register of Historic Places in 1985.  It was demolished in April 1999, leaving only its companion modern tower (erected in 1953), which itself was subsequently demolished and replaced with a communications tower.

See also
National Register of Historic Places listings in Reading, Massachusetts
National Register of Historic Places listings in Middlesex County, Massachusetts

References

Industrial buildings and structures on the National Register of Historic Places in Massachusetts
Infrastructure completed in 1890
Buildings and structures in Reading, Massachusetts
Demolished buildings and structures in Massachusetts
National Register of Historic Places in Reading, Massachusetts
Buildings and structures demolished in 1999